Mount Sinai Hospital may refer to:

Canada 
Mount Sinai Centre Hospital, affiliated with McGill University Faculty of Medicine, Quebec
Mount Sinai Hospital (Toronto), Ontario

United States 
Mount Sinai Hospital (Manhattan), New York
Mount Sinai Hospital (Cleveland), Ohio
Mount Sinai Hospital (Hartford), Connecticut
Mount Sinai Hospital (Minneapolis), Minnesota
Mount Sinai Hospital (Philadelphia, Pennsylvania) 
Mount Sinai Medical Center & Miami Heart Institute, Miami Beach, Florida
Mount Sinai Hospital, Chicago, formerly and briefly called Mount Sinai Medical Center, Illinois

See also
Sinai (disambiguation)
Mount Sinai (disambiguation)
Sinai Hospital (disambiguation)
Sinai Chicago, a hospital network in Chicago, Illinois, U.S.
Mount Sinai Health System, a hospital network in New York City, New York State, U.S.
Icahn School of Medicine at Mount Sinai, formerly Mount Sinai School of Medicine
Mount Sinai Journal of Medicine
Jewish Hospital (disambiguation)